Snooker world rankings 2007/2008: The professional world rankings for the top 75 snooker players (plus 7 other players who are ranked 76–82 officially; if all players on the pro tour were ranked they would be lower) in the 2007–08 season are listed below. The points listed here take into account ranking tournament performances from the previous two seasons (2005–06 and 2006–07).

Notes
Ding Junhui (27 to 9), Mark Selby (28 to 11) and Ryan Day (17 to 16) enter the top 16 for the first time. Additionally, Graeme Dott, Shaun Murphy, Neil Robertson and Ali Carter reach career-high rankings.
Stephen Hendry, who was still the number 1 the season before, drops down to number 8, marking his worst ranking since the 1987/88 season.
Jimmy White drops down from number 35 to number 60, after his least successful season ever, earning only 5725 points in the 06/07 season alone, down from 6450 in the 05/06 season.
 Former world number 4 Matthew Stevens drops down from number 14 to number 20.
Barry Hawkins and Anthony Hamilton both drop out of the top 16 after a single season – Hawkins is down from number 12 to number 19, and Hamilton from number 16 to number 26.
Mark Allen moves up the rankings, from number 62 to number 29. Jamie Cope also reaches the top 32 for the first time (48 to 22),
Three players re-enter the top 32 – Dave Harold (36 to 30), Dominic Dale (40 to 31) and Gerard Greene (39 to 32)
Five players necessarily dropped out of the top 32; they are: James Wattana (25 to 33), David Gray (23 to 35), Alan McManus (19 to 38), Andy Hicks (31 to 41) and Robert Milkins (32 to 47).
Andrew Higginson rises 66 places from number 110 to number 44.
Judd Trump is up 21 spots from number 72 to number 51.
Tony Drago drops out of the top 64, from 52 to 68.

References

2007
Rankings 2008
Rankings 2007